John Dewey "Jughandle Johnny" Morrison (October 22, 1895 – March 20, 1966) was a professional baseball player.  He was a right-handed pitcher over parts of ten seasons (1920–1927, 1929–1930) with the Pittsburgh Pirates and Brooklyn Robins.  For his career, he compiled a 103–80 record in 297 appearances, with a 3.65 earned run average and 546 strikeouts.  May was a member of the 1925 World Series champion Pirates, pitching three times during their seven-game defeat of the Washington Senators.  In World Series play, he recorded no decisions in 3 appearances, with a 2.89 earned run average and 7 strikeouts.

Morrison was born in Pellville, Kentucky, and later died in Louisville, Kentucky, at the age of 70, and was buried at Rosehill Elmwood Cemetery.  His son, Dwane Morrison, was a college basketball coach, most notably at Georgia Tech.

See also
 List of Major League Baseball annual saves leaders

References

External links

1895 births
1966 deaths
Pittsburgh Pirates players
Brooklyn Robins players
Major League Baseball pitchers
Baseball players from Kentucky
Anniston Moulders players
Mobile Sea Gulls players
Hanover Raiders players
Birmingham Barons players
Kansas City Blues (baseball) players
Atlanta Crackers players